Keegan Gerhard (born December 2, 1969) is an American pastry chef and the former host of the Food Network series Food Network Challenge. As of the tenth season, he has been replaced by Claire Robinson. Instead of being the host, he serves as a judge alongside Kerry Vincent. Gerhard along with wife are the owners and executive chefs of D Bar Desserts in Denver, Colorado and San Diego (closed).

References

Food Network
1960 births
Living people
People from Bad Homburg vor der Höhe